Merced is a district of the San José canton, in the San José province of Costa Rica. It is one of the four administrative units that form San José downtown properly. This division is merely commercial, but covers an important part of "josefino" life and activities.

Geography 
Merced has an area of 2.17 km² and an elevation of 1154 metres.

Merced lies in the north of the canton, limiting only with Tibás Canton from San José Province to the north, and with the districts of Uruca to the north, Mata Redonda to the west, Hospital to the south, and Uruca and El Carmen districts to the east, all of them from the same canton of San José.

Locations
This district comprehend several "barrios" or neighbourhoods, like Bajos de la Unión, Claret, Coca-Cola, Iglesias Flores, Mantica, Barrio México, Paso de la Vaca y Pitahaya. In the territory there are many banks, public institutions and popular markets. Its main landmark is the Costa Rican Center of Science and Culture, one of the main institutions of Costa Rican culture. The neighborhoods are full of history and some of them are known for received several immigrants from all over the world during different decades. By the early 1950s a lot of members of the Jewish and Asian communities were established around Paseo Colón near Barrio La Pitahaya and Mantica, this changed drastically after moving San José Synagogue to the West Area of the city (Escazú). Nowadays the zone is populated by Costa Ricans, Nicaraguans, Colombians, Venezuelans, Americans, Italians and Dominicans, making La Pitahaya one of the most diverse neighborhood in SJO. Barrio Mexico and Barrio Claret has been the first stop in San José for thousands for limonenses since the early 1960s.

Demographics 

For the 2011 census, Merced had a population of 12257 inhabitants.

Transportation

Road transportation 
The district is covered by the following road routes:
 National Route 1
 National Route 108

External links
Municipalidad de San José. Distrito Merced – Website of San Jose Mayor, includes a map of the district and related info.

References 

Districts of San José Province
Populated places in San José Province